Heterocampa umbrata, the white-blotched heterocampa, is a moth in the family Notodontidae (prominent moths) described by Francis Walker in 1855. It is found in North America.

The MONA or Hodges number for Heterocampa umbrata is 7990.

References

Further reading
 
Lafontaine, J. Donald, & Schmidt, B. Christian (2010). "Annotated check list of the Noctuoidea (Insecta, Lepidoptera) of North America north of Mexico". ZooKeys, vol. 40, 1-239.

External links

Butterflies and Moths of North America

Notodontidae